Real Oviedo Vetusta is a Spanish football club based in Oviedo, in the autonomous community of Asturias. Founded in 1929 as Unión Sportiva Ovetense, it is the reserve team of Real Oviedo, and currently plays in Segunda División RFEF – Group 1, holding home games at El Requexón, with a 3,000-seat capacity.

History
Founded in 1929 as Unión Sportiva Ovetense, the club was renamed to Sociedad Deportiva Vetusta in 1940. Vetusta reached the national categories ten years later, and even enjoyed 11 seasons in the third division, with two four-year spells.

Following the first team's relegation into the fourth level, the club disappeared in 2003, being re-formed three years later and regaining part of its original denomination (Vetusta) in 2008. After returning to Tercera División, Group 2, the club finished 8th in the 2010-11 season.

Club background
Unión Sportiva Ovetense (1929–1940)
Sociedad Deportiva Vetusta (1940–1979)
Real Oviedo Aficionados (1979–1989)
Sociedad Deportiva Vetusta (1989–1991)
Real Oviedo B (1991–2003; 2006–2021)
Real Oviedo Vetusta (2021–present)

Season to season
As a farm team

As a reserve team

14 seasons in Segunda División B
1 season in Segunda División RFEF
34 seasons in Tercera División
1 season in Tercera División RFEF

Current squad
.

From Youth Academy

Out on loan

Current technical staff

Honours
Tercera División: 1987–88, 1989–90, 2017–18

References

External links
Official website 
Futbolme team profile 
Club magazine 
Club blog 
Oviedín, fansite 

Football clubs in Asturias
Real Oviedo
Association football clubs established in 1929
Association football clubs established in 2006
Spanish reserve football teams
1929 establishments in Spain